Hilda is an unincorporated community in Taney County, Missouri, United States. It is located on U.S. Route 160 two miles east of the Kissee Mills recreation area on the Beaver Creek arm of Bull Shoals Lake and approximately fifteen miles east of Branson. The Hilda Lookout Tower in approximately one mile south on Lime Kiln Mountain.  Hilda is part of the Branson Micropolitan Statistical Area.

A post office called Hilda was established in 1896, and remained in operation until 1975. An early postmaster gave the community the first name of his wife, Hilda Mosely.

References

Unincorporated communities in Taney County, Missouri
Branson, Missouri micropolitan area
Unincorporated communities in Missouri